Gaurav Chanana (also known as Rhehan Malliek) is an Indian model and film and television actor. The role of Akash in Ishkq in Paris provided his major breakthrough. He also worked as a Second Unit Director or Assistant Director for Ittefaq (2001).

Career 

Gaurav appeared in the music video for the Yesudas song, Chamak cham cham chamake hai sitaro me tu hi, with Rimi Sen. He made his film debut in Woh Tera Naam Tha in 2004. He played the protagonist role of Dr. Rahul Mehra in the tele-series  Sanjivani, but was later replaced by Mihir Mishra. He also starred in soaps like Hey...Yehii To Haii Woh! on  Star One where he played the male lead and Risshton Ki Dor on  Sony TV as Rahul Raichand where he was later replaced by Amit Sareen.

Filmography

Television

Film

Music Video

He appeared in "Chamak Cham Cham Chamke Hain" (Sitaron Mein Tu Hi - 2000) along with actress Rimi Sen.

See also
List of Indian film actors

References

External links

G

Male actors in Hindi cinema
Indian male soap opera actors
Living people
Date of birth missing (living people)
Year of birth missing (living people)
aurav chanana Aiem jour big fen